Ya vizhu tvoy golos is a Russian television mystery music game show based on the South Korean programme of the same name. It premiered on Rossiya-1 on 14 May 2021.

Gameplay

Format
Presented with a group of six "mystery singers" identified only by their occupation, a guest artist and contestant must attempt to eliminate bad singers from the group without ever hearing them sing, assisted by clues and a celebrity panel over the course of four rounds. At the end of the game, the last remaining mystery singer is revealed as either good or bad by means of a duet between them and one of the guest artists.

Rewards
If the singer is good, the contestant wins ; if the singer is bad, the same amount is given to the bad singer instead.

Rounds
Each episode presents the guest artist and contestant with six people whose identities and singing voices are kept concealed until they are eliminated to perform on the "stage of truth" or remain in the end to perform the final duet.

Production

Background and development
VGTRK first announced the development of the series through CJ ENM and Fremantle's joint agreement in November 2020, It is produced by Studio WMedia.

Filming
Tapings for the programme took place at MosFilm Studio in Moscow. Due to the COVID-19 pandemic, it was filmed under health and safety protocols being implemented.

Episodes

Guest artists

Panelists

Reception

Television ratings

Source:

Notes

References

External links

International versions of I Can See Your Voice
2020s Russian television series
2021 Russian television series debuts
Russia-1 original programming
Russian game shows
Russian television series based on South Korean television series
Russian-language television shows